Adrián Ripa Cruz (born 12 August 1985) is a Spanish professional footballer who plays as a left back for SD Tarazona.

He played 211 matches in Segunda División over 11 seasons (no goals), with Huesca, Elche and Numancia.

Club career
Born in Épila, Province of Zaragoza, Aragon, Ripa started his career with Real Zaragoza's reserves. He scored 11 Tercera División goals in the 2006–07 season, but they could not achieve promotion in the playoffs in spite of finishing the regular season in first position.

In 2007, Ripa signed with Segunda División B club SD Huesca on loan. He won promotion in his first year, then made his professional debut in Segunda División on 7 September 2008 by coming on as a late substitute in the 1–1 away draw against Gimnàstic de Tarragona. 

Ripa started the 2009–10 campaign back in the third level, with Orihuela CF. During the winter transfer window, however, he returned to the division above after Elche CF paid his €30.000 buyout clause. He played 25 matches in 2010–11, helping his team to the fourth position in the standings and the subsequent playoffs.

On 20 June 2011, Ripa signed a two-year deal at CD Numancia as a free agent. He made 11 second-tier appearances in his first season, as understudy to Nano.

Ripa left the Nuevo Estadio Los Pajaritos in June 2019, as the 34-year-old's contract expired. He then returned to his native region, joining amateurs SD Tarazona.

Career statistics

References

External links

1985 births
Living people
People from Valdejalón
Sportspeople from the Province of Zaragoza
Spanish footballers
Footballers from Aragon
Association football defenders
Segunda División players
Segunda División B players
Tercera División players
Segunda Federación players
Real Zaragoza B players
SD Huesca footballers
Orihuela CF players
Elche CF players
CD Numancia players
SD Tarazona footballers